Demon Princes is a series of five science fiction novels by Jack Vance, which cumulatively relate the story of an adventurer, Kirth Gersen, as he exacts his revenge on five notorious criminals, collectively known as the Demon Princes, who carried the people of his village off into slavery during his childhood. Each novel deals with his pursuit of one of the five Princes, which extends from Earth to other planets using spaceships.

Novels
 Star King (1964). Gersen's first target for his revenge is Attel Malagate, a renegade from a species called the Star Kings. The Star Kings can consciously evolve themselves and are driven to imitate and surpass the most successful species they encounter. With their contact with humanity, they begin making themselves into imitations of human beings. Gersen traps him with an undeveloped and fantastically beautiful planet whose location is known only to Gersen. Malagate covets the planet in order to become the father of a new race that can outdo both humans and his own species.
 The Killing Machine (1964). Kokor Hekkus has prolonged his life by the vivisection of human beings to obtain hormones and other substances from their living bodies. Not content with just one life, he has converted the lost planet Thamber into a stage where he acts out his fantasies.
 The Palace of Love (1967). Viole Falushe is so obsessed with a girl from his youth that he created a number of clones of her in a vain attempt to psychologically manipulate one into returning his love. Gersen, disguised as a journalist, travels to Falushe's planet, where the Demon Prince has built an entire civilization acknowledging him as its supreme ruler.
 The Face (1979). Gersen pursues Lens Larque, a sadist and monumental trickster, to various planets. He uncovers Larque's most grandiose scheme: terraforming a moon into the shape of his laughing face to avenge a slight.
 The Book of Dreams (1981). Gersen foils several schemes by Howard Alan Treesong, already the head of the underworld, to take over the most powerful of humanity's organizations.

Publication history
The first three books in the series appeared in 1964-67 and were published in both hard cover and mass-market paperback editions under the Berkley Medallion imprint. There was a 12-year gap before the last two appeared in 1979 and 1981 and published as individual volumes in limited editions of 700 copies each by Underwood-Miller in 1981. The collected books were published as a limited edition set, The Demon Princes, in 1997. The Demon Princes books were republished by Spatterlight Press in 2016 as paperback volumes using the author-preferred text from the Vance Integral Edition.

Reception
Dave Langford reviewed Star King for White Dwarf #99, and stated that "The revenge plot is banal in the extreme, but the pace is headlong and it's impossible not to admire the backdrop." Arthur Jean Cox reviewed Star King in the August 1964 issue of Riverside Quarterly.

Greg Costikyan reviewed The Face in Ares Magazine #1. Costikyan commented that "All in all, The Face is an intriguing and well-plotted adventure in Vance's usual strange style. It is also considerably more expert and cleanly written than most of Vance's other work; apparently, Vance is still refining his style and sharpening his abilities. The Face is well worth reading, especially if you can get hold of the previous three novels in the 'Demon Princes' series."

References

External links
 
 

Novels by Jack Vance
Science fiction book series
Demon Princes series
Novels set on fictional planets